Filmauro is an Italian media company, involved primarily in the production and distribution of films, founded in 1975 by Luigi De Laurentiis.

The company catalogue counts over 400 movies. The company also owns a series of movie theaters in Rome, Italy, and the Serie A football club, SSC Napoli.

They produced the successful annual Cinepanettone films.

External links
 Filmauro Corporate page

References

Mass media companies established in 1975
Film production companies of Italy
Film distributors of Italy
Mass media companies of Italy
Companies based in Rome
Mass media in Rome
Italian companies established in 1975